Khamyang may refer to:

Khamyang language, spoken in the Buri Dihing Valley of Assam, India. It may be identical to the "Nora language" mentioned by Grierson in 1904
Khamyang people, a tribal group found primarily in Tinsukia, Jorhat and Sivasagar districts of Assam as well as adjacent parts of Arunachal Pradesh.Namsai Chongkham

Copy and Paste stuff 
 Only use these if applicable (i.e. you checked)